The 2019 European Karate Championships were the 54th edition of the European Karate Championships, and were held in Guadalajara, Spain from 28 to 31 May 2019.

Medalists

Men

Women

Medal table

Participating nations 
559 athletes from 51 nations competed.

Para Karate 
46 athletes from 16 nations in 6 events was competed in 2nd European Para Karate Championships. Results:

References

External links
 World Karate Federation
 Results book

European Championships, 2019
2019 in Spanish sport
2019
International karate competitions hosted by Spain
Karate competitions in Spain
Sport in Guadalajara, Spain
May 2019 sports events in Spain